Tuapse is a town in Krasnodar Krai, Russia, situated on the northeast shore of the Black Sea, south of Gelendzhik and north of Sochi. Population: 

Tuapse is a sea port and the northern center of a resort zone which extends south to Sochi.

History

Early history

Tuapse was a large center (native land) for the Shapsugs tribe along other areas in Circassia, with about 10,000 speakers of the language living in Tuapse currently. The name of the town is itself Adyghe (literally meaning "two waters") since Tuapse was part of historical Circassia and it became a part of Russia during the rule of Tsar Alexander I in 1801-1825.

Pre-21st century
The modern settlement dates back to 1838, when the Russian fort of Velyaminovsky was established in the area after this region became a part of Russia in 1829 by Treaty of Adrianople. During the Crimean War, the Ottomans seized the fort and held it for two years (1857–1859). The village of Velyaminovskoye was established here in 1864; it is the village that later became Tuapse. Town status was granted to Tuapse in 1896. During the Russian Empire, the town was the administrative capital of the Tuapsinsky Okrug.

The Soviets developed Tuapse as an oil terminal and depot. An oil pipeline from Grozny and Maykop was in operation by 1928, designed by Vladimir Shukhov. An oil refinery dates from the same period. No later than 1941, Tuapse's status was changed to that of a town of the krai subordination.

During World War II, the German military attempted to seize the town during the Battle of the Caucasus, which caused major damage to Tuapse. The Germans took the port and reached the hills above. The port was involved with massacres related to the Katyn massacre.

Russian Federation
Following the Russian invasion of Ukraine in 2022, the Ukrainian military attacked the port of Tuapse on 28 February 2023, causing a large fire at the Rosneft oil terminal, reportedly by two uncrewed aerial vehicles (UAVs).

Administrative and municipal status
Within the framework of administrative divisions, Tuapse serves as the administrative center of Tuapsinsky District, even though it is not a part of it. As an administrative division, it is incorporated separately as the Town of Tuapse—an administrative unit with the status equal to that of the districts. As a municipal division, the Town of Tuapse is incorporated within Tuapsinsky Municipal District as Tuapsinskoye Urban Settlement.

Climate
Tuapse has a humid subtropical climate (Köppen climate classification Cfa). Tuapse has warm to hot summers and cool winters with frequent rainfall year round.

Economy and transport

Tuapse is home to the Tuapse oil terminal.

Tuapse is one of the key transport hubs of the Black Sea coast of the Russian Federation. The city's location determines its key importance to ensure a ground connection with the Spa capital of the country — the city of Sochi, and also makes an important item in the export commodities of the country (oil, fertilizer, coal, etc.).

There is a railway station in Tuapse.

Miscellaneous

The Russian Children Center Orlyonok (former All-Russian SFSR Young Pioneer camp) is located there. The world chess champion Vladimir Kramnik and 2005 Miss Universe winner, Natalie Glebova, were born in Tuapse.

Twin towns and sister cities

Tuapse is twinned with:
 Agen, France

References

Notes

Sources

External links
Official website of Tuapse  
Unofficial website of Tuapse 

Cities and towns in Krasnodar Krai
Black Sea Governorate
Populated places established in 1838
Port cities and towns in Russia
1838 establishments in Europe
1838 establishments in the Russian Empire